Barry Richards (born 16 December 1967) is a South African cricketer. He played in six first-class matches for Boland in 1992/93 and 1993/94.

See also
 List of Boland representative cricketers

References

External links
 

1967 births
Living people
South African cricketers
Boland cricketers
Cricketers from Cape Town